Vickie Johnson (born April 15, 1972) is an American former basketball player and assistant coach of the Atlanta Dream. She was previously the head coach of the Dallas Wings in the WNBA. Johnson is the former head coach of the San Antonio Stars. Upon the sale and relocation of the Stars, Johnson was hired by head coach Bill Laimbeer as an assistant coach of the Las Vegas Aces, the Stars' decedent team.

Early years
Johnson grew up in Coushatta, Louisiana. Johnson was a letter-man in basketball and track and field. In track and field, she was the Louisiana State Champion on the long jump as a senior.

College years
Vickie Johnson was a two-time All-American and Sun Belt Conference MVP at Louisiana Tech University. She led the Lady Techsters to the 1994 NCAA Championship Game, was named Sun Belt Conference Player of the Year in 1995 and earned Louisiana Player of the Year honors in 1996. She finished her career at Louisiana Tech with 1,891 career points and 831 rebounds and was inducted into the Louisiana Tech Athletic Hall of Fame in 2007. She graduated from Louisiana Tech in 1996.

WNBA career
Johnson was selected 12th overall in the second round of the inaugural WNBA Elite draft in 1997, which was composed of professional women's basketball players who had competed in other leagues, usually international leagues.

She was a two-time WNBA all-star and was the first New York Liberty player to record 2000 points.

In June 2005 in honor of Johnson's 3,000 points scored, Sandy Levine, owner of the world-famous Carnegie Deli in Manhattan, created the VJ Classic sandwich, a  belly-busting sandwich.

Johnson ended an eight-year career with the Liberty by signing with the San Antonio Silver Stars on February 9, 2006.

Johnson retired from play at the end of 2009 season.

Coaching record

|-
| align="left" | SAS
| align="left" | 2017
| 34 || 8 || 26 ||  || align="center" | 6th in West || - || - || - || -
| align="center" |Missed Playoffs
|-
| align="left" | DAL
| align="left" | 2021
| 32 || 14 || 18 ||  || align="center" | 5th in West || 1 || 0 || 1 ||  
| align="center" | Lost in 1st Round
|-
| align="left" | DAL
| align="left" | 2022
| 36 || 18 || 18 ||  || align="center" | 3rd in West || 3 || 1 || 2 ||  
| align="center" | Lost in 1st Round
|- class="sortbottom"
| align="left" | Career
| || 102 || 40 || 62 ||  ||  || 4 || 1 || 3 ||

European career
 1996-1997:  Tarbes Gespe Bigorre
 1997-1998:  W Bordeaux Basket
 1998-2000:  Lachen Ramat Hasharon
 2000-2001:  Elitzur Cellcom Holon
 2004-2005:  Trentino Rovereto Basket
 2005-2007:  MiZo Pécs
 2007-2008:  Galatasaray

References

External links
WNBA player profile
WNBA chat transcript

1972 births
Living people
All-American college women's basketball players
American expatriate basketball people in France
American expatriate basketball people in Hungary
American expatriate basketball people in Israel
American expatriate basketball people in Italy
American expatriate basketball people in Turkey
American women's basketball coaches
American women's basketball players
Basketball coaches from Louisiana
Basketball players from Louisiana
Dallas Wings coaches
Galatasaray S.K. (women's basketball) players
Las Vegas Aces coaches
Louisiana Tech Lady Techsters basketball players
New York Liberty draft picks
New York Liberty players
Parade High School All-Americans (girls' basketball)
People from Coushatta, Louisiana
San Antonio Stars coaches
San Antonio Stars players
Shooting guards
Tarbes Gespe Bigorre players
Women's National Basketball Association All-Stars